Saboteur is a mining-themed card game, designed by Frederic Moyersoen and first published in 2004.

Base game 

In the base game, players are assigned either a "Miner" or a "Saboteur" role, and given a mixed hand of path and action cards, and take turns in succession playing one card from their hand (or discarding it) and collecting a new one from the draw pile.

Miners may play a path card in order to progress in building a tunnel from a special card which represents the mine start to one of the three special cards that represent possible gold locations (only one of which is effectively gold, but the players do not know which when the game begins as they are placed face down), while Saboteurs try to play path cards which actually hinder such progress (for example by ending paths or making them turn in opposite directions).

Either role can instead play an action card, which have varying effects such as blocking other players from building paths (breaking their tools, in the game's analogy) or unblocking themselves or other players (usually the ones they believe to share the same role of either Miner or Saboteur). Action cards can also be used to block other cards depending on the gamers' opinions.

There are three rounds of play, where each round is concluded by either reaching the treasure or running out of action cards.

Setup 

The game should be set up where the mine entrance card is separated by seven cards from the middle treasure card, and the other two treasure cards are either above or below, separated by one card each. Cards should all be placed in a portrait orientation.

Each type of card should be mixed with those sharing the same back design (such as gold nugget cards with gold nugget cards and playing cards with other playing cards).

Overview 

 3 rounds.
 The player with the most gold nuggets at the end of the game wins.
 Player roles are randomly assigned at the start of each round in secret:
 Gold-Diggers win as a team by forming a path from the 'start' card to the treasure card.
 Saboteurs win as a team if the treasure is not found.
 The treasure card is randomly assigned to one of the three goal cards at the start of each round in secret.

Roles

Saboteur 1 

 3-10 Players.
 Roles are randomly assigned in secret.

{|class="wikitable" style="width:auto;text-align:center;"
|+Saboteur 1: Roles
!style="text-align:left;"|# Players
!style="width:1rem;"|3
!style="width:1rem;"|4
!style="width:1rem;"|5
!style="width:1rem;"|6
!style="width:1rem;"|7
!style="width:1rem;"|8
!style="width:1rem;"|9
!style="width:1rem;"|10
|-
!style="text-align:left;"|# Saboteurs
|1
|1
|2
|2
|3
|3
|3
|4
|-
!style="text-align:left;"|# Gold-Diggers
|3
|4
|4
|5
|5
|6
|7
|7
|}

Saboteur 2 

 2-12 Players.
 Roles are randomly assigned in secret.

Saboteurs 

 Win if gold is not found.

Blue Gold-Diggers 

 Win if gold is found by:
 Any player that is not a Green Gold-Digger and at least one way there does not have a green door, or
 A Green Gold-Digger and all ways there have a blue door (and at least one of those ways does not also have a green door in series).

Green Gold-Diggers 

 Win if gold is found by:
 Any player that is not a Blue Gold-Digger and at least one way there does not have a blue door, or
 A Blue Gold-Digger and all ways there have a green door (and at least one of those ways does not also have a blue door in series).

Boss 

 Wins if gold is found.
 When the treasure is divided, gets one fewer Gold Piece than Gold-Diggers.

Profiteer 

 Always wins.
 When the treasure is divided, gets two'' fewer Gold Pieces than the winning Gold-Diggers or Saboteurs (or one fewer Gold Piece than the Boss).

 Geologists 

 Not 'winners'.
 Receive 1 Gold Piece for each visible crystal.
 If both Geologists are in play, they split the Gold Pieces (rounded down).

 Game play 

{|class="wikitable" style="width:auto;text-align:center;"
|+Saboteur 1: Hand size
!style="text-align:left;"|# Players
!style="width:1rem;"|3
!style="width:1rem;"|4
!style="width:1rem;"|5
!style="width:1rem;"|6
!style="width:1rem;"|7
!style="width:1rem;"|8
!style="width:1rem;"|9
!style="width:1rem;"|10
|-
!style="text-align:left;"|# Cards
|6
|6
|6
|5
|5
|4
|4
|4
|}

 Players take turns to play a card or discard.
 The cards are of two types:

 Path cards 

 Always played in a portrait (upright) orientation.
 May be rotated 180°.
 Each edge must fit with the surrounding cards.
 Must be connected to the start card.

 Action cards 

 Sabotage 

 Break one tool of another player.
 A player with a broken tool cannot play a path card!

 Repair 

 Repair one tool of any player.

 Map 

 See any goal card in secret.

 Rockfall 

 Remove any played path card for the remainder of the round.
 Note: the start card and goal cards cannot be removed.

 Round end 

 A path connects the start card to the treasure goal card, or
 All cards have been played or discarded.
 If the treasure card is not found, the Saboteurs get 3 gold nuggets each (or 4 gold nuggets if they are the only winner).
 If the treasure is found, the Gold-Diggers get one gold card each.

 Gold cards 

 28 gold cards:
 4 three nuggets.
 8 two nuggets.
 16 one nugget.

 Example 

 5 Gold-Diggers.
 DiggerA finds the treasure goal card.
 5 random gold cards are selected: 3, 2, 2, 1, 1.
 The player who found the treasure card chooses a (highest value) gold card.
 The gold cards are then passed counter-clockwise (opposite direction to turn order):
 DiggerA chooses 3 nuggets.
 DiggerB chooses 2 nuggets.
 DiggerC chooses 2 nuggets.
 DiggerD chooses 1 nugget.
 DiggerE gets the last 1 nugget.

 Saboteur 2 

 New path cards 

 Green doors  

 Prevent Blue Gold Diggers from passing through.

 Blue doors 

 Prevent Green Gold Diggers from passing through.

 Ladders 

 Connect to the 'start' card.
 Allows additional paths to the gold that can be disconnected from the 'start' card.
 Cannot open goal cards.

 Bridges 

 Two straight paths that are not connected.

 New action cards 

 Theft 

 At the end of the round, allows the player to steal 1 Gold Piece from one other player who has >0 Gold Pieces.
 Only takes effect if the player is not Trapped!.

 Hands Off 

 Remove Theft from another player.

 Swap Your Hand 

 Exchange the cards in your hand with another player.

 Inspection 

 See the role card of another player in secret.

 Swap Your Hats 

 Exchange the role card of any player with a random role card leftover at the beginning of the round.
 Note: the new role card might be the same role type!
 e.g. a Saboteur role card is discarded and another Saboteur role card is drawn.

 Trapped! 

 Prevent a player from playing path cards.
 At the end of the round, a player who is Trapped! gets 0 Gold Pieces.

 Free at last! 

 Remove Trapped! from a player.

 Saboteur 1: Variants 

 Old mine 

 The old mine was not as packed with gold... sometimes all you got for your digging was worthless stones!
 6 one nugget gold cards removed.
 6 worthless stone cards added.

 Competitive 

 Any Gold-Diggers with a Sabotage card (broken pickaxe, lamp or trolley) at the end of a round do not get any gold cards.
 i.e. the gold cards are distributed between the gold diggers who have no broken tool. Saboteurs are not affected by this rule.''
 Sabotage your Gold-Digger team for greater reward... but not too often, or your team might lose!

Selfish Dwarf 

 One Gold-Digger role card is removed.
 One Selfish Dwarf role card is added.
 If the Selfish Dwarf wins, they get 4 gold nuggets and all other players get 0 gold nuggets.
 If the Gold-Diggers win, the Selfish Dwarf loses with the Saboteurs.
 # Gold cards = # Gold-Diggers (the Selfish Dwarf is excluded).

{|class="wikitable" style="width:auto;text-align:center;"
|+Saboteur 1: Selfish Dwarf variant
!style="text-align:left;"|# Players
!style="width:1rem;"|3
!style="width:1rem;"|4
!style="width:1rem;"|5
!style="width:1rem;"|6
!style="width:1rem;"|7
!style="width:1rem;"|8
!style="width:1rem;"|9
!style="width:1rem;"|10
|-
!style="text-align:left;"|# Saboteurs
|1
|1
|2
|2
|3
|3
|3
|4
|-
!style="text-align:left;"|# Gold-Diggers
|2
|3
|3
|4
|4
|5
|6
|6
|-
!style="text-align:left;"|# Selfish Dwarves
|1
|1
|1
|1
|1
|1
|1
|1
|-
!style="text-align:left;"|# Gold cards
|2
|3
|3
|4
|4
|5
|6
|6
|}

Tournament 

 5-9 players.
 Fixed number of role cards.
 1 Selfish Dwarf.
 If the Gold-Diggers win, the first Gold-Digger gets 3 gold nuggets and the others get 2 gold nuggets.
 If the Selfish Dwarf wins, they get 4 gold nuggets and all other players get 0 gold nuggets.

{|class="wikitable" style="width:auto;text-align:center;"
|+Saboteur 1: Tournament roles
!style="text-align:left;"|# Players
!style="width:1rem;"|5
!style="width:1rem;"|6
!style="width:1rem;"|7
!style="width:1rem;"|8
!style="width:1rem;"|9
|-
!style="text-align:left;"|# Saboteurs
|1
|2
|2
|2
|3
|-
!style="text-align:left;"|# Gold-Diggers
|3
|3
|4
|5
|5
|-
!style="text-align:left;"|# Selfish Dwarves
|1
|1
|1
|1
|1
|}

Saboteur 2: Splitting the treasure 

{|class="wikitable" style="width:auto;text-align:center;"
|+Saboteur 2: Gold
!style="text-align:left;"|# Winners*
!style="width:1rem;"|1
!style="width:1rem;"|2
!style="width:1rem;"|3
!style="width:1rem;"|4
!style="width:1rem;"|5+
|-
!style="text-align:left;"|# Gold Pieces
|5
|4
|3
|2
|1
|}*Note: Geologists do not count as 'winners'.

Example 1 

 1 Blue Gold-Digger
 2 Green Gold-Diggers
 1 Boss
 1 Profiteer
 2 Saboteurs
 Both Saboteurs have a Theft.
 One Saboteur has been Trapped!.

Gold-Digger win 

 The Boss completes the path to the goal card with the treasure.
 The path is blocked by a blue door.
 The Blue Gold-Diggers have won (including the Boss and the Profiteer).
 3 winners.
 The Blue Gold-Digger gets 3 Gold Pieces.
 The Boss gets 3 − 1 = 2 Gold Pieces.
 The Profiteer gets 3 − 2 = 1 Gold Piece.
 Note: If a Green Gold-Digger had connected the treasure to the start card, the Blue team would have won anyway, as the path to the treasure is closed to the Green team by a blue door.
 The Saboteur who is not trapped takes 1 Gold Piece from any one of the other players (who have > 0 Gold Pieces).

Saboteur win 

 The treasure is not found.
 The Saboteurs have won (including the Profiteer).
 2 winners.
 The Saboteur who is not trapped gets 4 Gold Pieces.
 The Profiteer gets 4 − 2 = 2 Gold Pieces.
 The Saboteur who is not trapped takes 1 Gold Piece from any one of the other players (who have > 0 Gold Pieces).

Example 2 

 1 Blue Gold-Digger
 3 Green Gold-Diggers
 1 Profiteer
 1 Saboteur
 1 Geologist
 The Saboteur has a Theft.

Gold-Digger win 

 A Green Gold-Digger completes the path to the goal card with the treasure.
 There is at least one path without a blue door.
 The Green Gold-Diggers have won (including the Profiteer).
 4 winners.
 The Green Gold-Diggers get 2 Gold Pieces each.
 The Profiteer gets 2 − 2 = 0 Gold Pieces!
 Note: Even though there were no doors in the path to the treasure, the blue gold digger gets 0 gold nuggets because a green digger found the treasure.
 The Saboteur who is not trapped takes 1 Gold Piece from any one of the other players (who have > 0 Gold Pieces).

References

External links 

 
 Saboteur rules published by AMIGO
 Saboteur 2 rules published by AMIGO
 Saboteur: The Duel rules published by Mayfair Games under licence from AMIGO © 2016
 Saboteur: The Lost Mines rules published by AMIGO © 2019
 Russian language version of Saboteur published by "Triominos.ru"

Card games introduced in 2004
Dedicated deck card games
Connection games